Candidula verticillata is a species of air-breathing land snail, a terrestrial pulmonate gastropod mollusk in the family Geomitridae, the hairy snails and their allies. 

This is a taxon inquirendum.

Distribution

This species occurs in Greece.

References

 Bank, R. A.; Neubert, E. (2017). Checklist of the land and freshwater Gastropoda of Europe. Last update: July 16th, 2017

External links
 Pfeiffer, L. (1870-1871). Diagnosen neuer Landschnecken. Malakozoologische Blätter. Cassel (Theodor Fischer). 17 (2): 93-94

verticillata
Gastropods described in 1871